Mircea Zamfir (born 29 May 1985 in Bucharest, Romania) is a  Romanian aerobic gymnast. He won six world championships medals (three gold, two silver and one bronze) and seven European championships medals (six gold and one bronze). He is also the individual 2007 European champion.

References

External links
Federation Internationale de Gymnastique Profiles: Mircea Zamfir

1985 births
Living people
Gymnasts from Bucharest
Romanian aerobic gymnasts
Male aerobic gymnasts
Universiade medalists in gymnastics
Medalists at the Aerobic Gymnastics World Championships
Universiade silver medalists for Romania
Competitors at the 2009 World Games
World Games gold medalists
Medalists at the 2011 Summer Universiade